Andrea Jaeger (born June 4, 1965) is an American former professional tennis player. A world No. 2, Jaeger's brief but highly successful tennis career ended prematurely due to major shoulder injuries. Jaeger started her professional tennis career at the age of 14 and went on to win pro tennis tournaments while still competing in other junior tennis events. By the age of 16, she was the second ranked female professional tennis player in the world. She reached the singles final of Wimbledon in 1983 and the French Open in 1982. She reached the singles semifinals of the Australian Open in 1982 and of the U.S. Open in 1980 and 1982. She also won 10 singles titles. During her career she  defeated almost all top ranked tennis players and defeated Chris Evert three times in a row becoming the only player able to stop Chris Evert’s clay court historic win streak.

In mixed doubles, Jaeger won the French Open with Jimmy Arias in 1981. During her career, Jaeger won U.S. $1.4 million in prize money and millions more in endorsements. After retirement in 1987, she has prominently dedicated her life to public service, charities, and philanthropy. She is a member of the Episcopal Church and based in Santa Rosa Beach, Florida, U.S.

Tennis career
Jaeger, grew up in Skokie and Lincolnshire. While a student at Stevenson High School in suburban Chicago, Jaeger was the top ranked player in the United States in the 18-and-under age group. She won 13 U.S. national junior titles, including the most prominent junior titles in tennis: the 1979 Orange Bowl and 1979 Boca Raton.

In 1980 (at the age of 15 years, 19 days), she became the youngest player ever to be seeded at Wimbledon, a record that was broken by Jennifer Capriati in 1990. After defeating former champion Virginia Wade, she became the youngest quarterfinalist in the history of the tournament. Later in the year, she became the youngest semifinalist in US Open history. By the age of 16, she had become the second ranked female professional tennis player in the world.

Jaeger had become a household name on the front pages of news publications, notable magazines and appearances on TV. People Magazine, Sports Illustrated, Life Magazine visited her junior high and high school. One of her endorsement commercials featured Jaeger with Bjorn Borg and another with her Mom, highlighting a new way of viewing sports prodigies.

At the French Open in 1982, Jaeger defeated Chris Evert in the semifinal 6–3, 6–1 but lost the final to Martina Navratilova. She then reached the semifinals of both the US Open and the Australian Open, losing both matches to Evert in straight sets. Jaeger had defeated Chris Evert three times in a row, becoming the only player to stop Evert’s clay court historic win streak.

At Wimbledon in 1983, Jaeger defeated six-time Wimbledon singles champion Billie Jean King 6–1, 6–1 in a semifinal on Centre Court, which was King's last career singles match at that tournament and her most lopsided singles defeat at Wimbledon. Jaeger then lost the final to Navratilova. In 2003, Jaeger said that the night before the final, she had a heated argument with her father over practicing and was locked out of her apartment by him. Eventually, Jaeger asked Navratilova to convince her father to let her back in.

Jaeger's career win–loss record against other top players was 3–17 against Evert, 4–11 against Navratilova, 2–8 against Tracy Austin, 6–8 against Hana Mandlíková, and 2–4 against Pam Shriver.

In an interview in 2003, Jaeger stated that she never was committed to being the top-ranked player in the world and tanked matches to avoid the top spot. As she rose toward the top of the game, she started visiting hospitals during tournaments. She stated that she found it, in the words of a USA Today columnist, "difficult to reconcile the narrow-minded focus of a top tennis player with her desire to help others."

Jaeger won eight of the nine singles matches she played for the U.S. in Fed Cup. She also won two of the three Wightman Cup singles matches she played for the U.S.

A major shoulder injury at the age of 19 ended Jaeger's career prematurely in 1985. She went to college and obtained a degree in theology and ministry training.

Philanthropy
Jaeger used her winnings from tennis to create the Silver Lining Foundation in 1990. The foundation's purpose was to provide long term care to children with cancer and children in need. Originally located in Aspen, Colorado, the organization transported groups of young cancer patients to Aspen for a week of support and activities, including horseback riding and whitewater rafting. The foundation also provided money for reunions, family campouts, college scholarships, medical internships, and other programs for children who could not travel. Her foundation is open year round, fundraises for donations to continue providing programs for long term care and a better quality of life to children with cancer and children in need. The first contributor was John McEnroe. Many high-profile celebrities were involved due to respecting Jaeger’s lifetime commitment to helping children with cancer and children in need, including Andre Agassi, Pete Sampras, David Robinson, Cindy Crawford, David Foster and Kevin Costner. In 1996, Jaeger received the Samuel S. Beard Award for Greatest Public Service by an Individual 35 Years or Under, an award given annually by Jefferson Awards.

Jaeger's autobiography, First Service, was published in 2004. In the book, she discussed her teenage years as a tennis player and her lifetime friendship with God and focus on serving God. All proceeds from the book were donated to children's charities.

Jaeger’s Children’s Foundation was renamed ‘Little Star Foundation’, giving tribute to children who have passed and are still alive, especially giving tribute to Rhea Olsen, a teenager with cancer from Chicago. Olsen became best friends with Jaeger and became the first ever paid employee of the Foundation. Jaeger helped Olsen for years before the teen passed on from cancer. 

In 2006, Jaeger exchanged gifts with an Army Ranger serving in the Iraq War. Jaeger knew the boy since his cancer diagnosis and through her foundation had helped the boy through his cancer by providing support through her foundation. He gave her his dog tags, and she gave him her Olympic ring.

In the aftermath of Hurricane Sandy, Jaeger’s Foundation provided food, medical, daily, educational and recreational supplies and support to help.

In April 2007, Jaeger and several former athletes, including Andre Agassi, Lance Armstrong, Tony Hawk, Jackie Joyner-Kersee, and Muhammad Ali, appeared on the American morning television talk show Good Morning America to announce their formation of a charity titled Athletes for Hope.

Major finals

Grand Slam finals

Singles: 2 runner-ups

Mixed doubles: 1 title

Year-end championships finals

Singles: 1 runner-up

WTA career finals

Singles: 36 (10–26)

Doubles: 6 (4–2)

Grand Slam singles performance timeline

See also 

 Performance timelines for all female tennis players who reached at least one Grand Slam final

References

External links
 
 
 
 
 
 
 Athletes for Hope

American female tennis players
21st-century American Episcopalian nuns
French Open champions
Olympic tennis players of the United States
People from La Plata County, Colorado
Tennis players from Chicago
Tennis players at the 1984 Summer Olympics
1965 births
Living people
Grand Slam (tennis) champions in mixed doubles